Goran Jurak  (born 3. April 1977 in Celje, SFR Yugoslavia (present-day Slovenia)) is a Slovenian former professional basketball player.

He plays the position of Power forward. He played in the Slovenian All Star Game 1999 through 2002. He was a member of the Slovenian national team.

He join, before season 2017-18, KK Celje as director of manager board.

Career statistics

Euroleague

|-
| style="text-align:left;"| 2002–03
| style="text-align:left;"| Union Olimpija
| 20 || 16 || 21.2 || .487 || .571 || .577 || 5.0 || 1.0 || 1.1 || .1 || 10.9 || 10.4
|-
| style="text-align:left;"| 2003–04
| style="text-align:left;"| Olympiacos
| 20 || 18 || 26.1 || .510 || .250 || .565 || 4.8 || 1.4 || 1.1 || .2 || 7.7 || 8.8
|-
| style="text-align:left;"| 2006–07
| style="text-align:left;"| Union Olimpija
| 2 || 0 || 27.5 || .600 || .333 || .600 || 7.0 || 2.0 || 2.0 || .0 || 10.5 || 15.5
|-
| style="text-align:left;"| 2007–08
| style="text-align:left;"| Žalgiris
| 19 || 1 || 17.2 || .635 || .250 || .634 || 5.2 || .7 || .8 || .1 || 6.8 || 7.9

Sources
(Goodyear League)

References

1977 births
Living people
BC Žalgiris players
Fortitudo Pallacanestro Bologna players
KK Olimpija players
Olympiacos B.C. players
Pallacanestro Biella players
Pallacanestro Cantù players
Sportspeople from Celje
Power forwards (basketball)
Slovenian men's basketball players
2006 FIBA World Championship players